A busabok is a small open structure used in Thai culture as a throne for the monarch or for the enshrinement of Buddha images or other sacred objects. It is square-based and open-sided, usually with twelve indented corners, with four posts supporting a roughly pyramidal multi-tiered roof culminating in a pointed spire, and usually richly decorated. The structure of the multi-tiered roof is very similar, but much smaller in size, to the mondop architectural form. The term is derived from the Sanskrit word , a reference to the Pushpaka Vimana, a flying chariot from the Hindu epic Ramayana (and the Thai version Ramakien).

Busabok are used for royal thrones, including the Busabok Mala Throne in the Amarin Winitchai Throne Hall of the Grand Palace, as well as the thrones used ceremonially in royal barge processions. Smaller busabok are used to house objects associated with the king—an early documented example was used to carry the royal letter of King Narai to Louis XIV in the 1686 Siamese embassy to France. Busabok are also used as shrines housing Buddha images, notably the Emerald Buddha in Wat Phra Kaew and Phra Phuttha Sihing at the Bangkok National Museum. Very large versions have formed the design of the temporary crematoria used for royal funerals of previous kings. The busabok was also the basis for a style of Buddhist pulpit known as thammat yot or busabok thammat.

Gallery

See also
Palin, the Burmese throne

References

Thai art
Thai monarchy
Thai Buddhist art and architecture